Qatari Unified Sign Language is a proposal by the Qatari Supreme Council for Family Affairs to unify the deaf sign language, or perhaps languages, of Qatar.  A dictionary has been published.  The council's description suggests that sign language in Qatar may belong to the Arab Sign Language family.

References

Sign language isolates
Languages of Qatar
Arab sign languages